William Fenton Hunnefield (January 5, 1899 – August 28, 1976) was a Major League Baseball infielder.

Baseball career
Hunnefield was a member of the Massachusetts state champion baseball team from Framingham High School in 1916 (as reported in the Middlesex News on February 14, 1993), and graduated from Framingham High in 1918.

Hunnefield attended Northeastern University, where he played on the baseball team. He was an infielder who played for the Chicago White Sox and Cleveland Indians of the American League and the Boston Braves and New York Giants of the National League in a six-season career from 1926 to 1931.

Playing in a total of 511 games, his batting average was .272 and his fielding percentage was .944. He finished second in the league in stolen bases in 1926. He played on the winning side in two no-hitters: Ted Lyons (1926) and Wes Ferrell (1931).

There is a vintage "exhibit" card issued in 1927 that pictures Chicago White Sox pitcher Tommy Thomas, and was mislabeled as "Wm. Hunnefield". Bill Hunnefield does appear in a 1993 baseball card set created from photo archives of the Sporting News on card #696.

After his major league career, he was a player and manager in the summer Cape Cod League back when it was an "open" league. He also was a manager in the semi-pro Boston Parks League in the early 1940s.

In the off-season, Hunnefield was an accountant and often reported late to spring training because it coincided with tax season.

In the late 1940s he moved to New York City with his wife, Jean Nathan, where they founded the Jean Nate company. They operated this company successfully until its sale in 1963 to Lanvin.

External links

Sports Illustrated Bill Hunnefield
Bill Hunnefield MLB Baseball Player
Baseball library
Bill Hunnefield baseball card

1899 births
1976 deaths
Boston Braves players
Chicago White Sox players
Cleveland Indians players
New York Giants (NL) players
Major League Baseball infielders
Major League Baseball second basemen
Major League Baseball shortstops
Baseball players from Massachusetts
Framingham High School alumni
Sportspeople from Dedham, Massachusetts
Elmira Pioneers players
Jersey City Skeeters players
Montreal Royals players
Norfolk Tars players
Portland Beavers players
Rochester Red Wings players
Toledo Mud Hens players
Waterbury Brasscos players